Singchung is a census town in West Kameng district, Arunachal Pradesh, India. As per 2011 Census of India, Singchung has a total population of 14,534 people including 9260 males and 5,274 females.

Bugun community is the primary community of Singchung, and their livelihood is cultivation including orchid farming.

References 

West Kameng district